The Law vs. Billy the Kid is a 1954 American western film directed by William Castle and starring Scott Brady, Betta St. John and Paul Cavanagh. It was produced by Sam Katzman for distribution by Columbia Pictures.

Plot
Cheated out of a half month's pay, William Bonney takes his money anyway and rides off. He kills one of the men who pursues him and soon becomes better known in the territory as Billy the Kid.

Pat Garrett, a cowboy who considers Billy a friend, finds him a job at British land baron John Tunstall's giant ranch in New Mexico. Rustlers are causing Tunstall trouble and he asks Garrett and Billy to help protect his property. Billy tries to go straight, partly because he's fallen in love with a local beauty, Nita Maxwell.

Bob Olinger, a brutal foreman, takes a dislike to Billy and beats him up. Olinger also goes to a crooked lawman, Watkins, to dig up a wanted poster on Billy and insist on his arrest.

A posse comes looking for Billy and kills Tunstall by mistake. Billy guns down the man who pulled the trigger. The governor of New Mexico wants to replace Watkins and asks Garrett to take the job. Garrett declines until the governor vows to institute martial law and have Billy shot on sight. Billy tries to go along with Garrett peaceably, but others like Olinger demand that he hang.

Billy kills Olinger and flees. He tries to get to Nita with a wedding ring and a proposal they begin a new life in Mexico, but then he is shot dead by Garrett.

Cast
 Scott Brady as William 'Billy the Kid' Bonney
 Betta St. John as Nita Maxwell
 James Griffith as Pat Garrett
 Alan Hale, Jr. as Bob Olinger
 Paul Cavanagh as John H. Tunstall
 William 'Bill Phillips as Charley Bowdre
 Benny Rubin as Arnold Dodge
 Steve Darrell as Sheriff Tom Watkins
 George Berkeley as Tom O'Folliard
 William Tannen as Dave Rudabaugh
 Richard H. Cutting as Pete Maxwell

References

External links
 
 
 

1954 films
1954 Western (genre) films
American Western (genre) films
Biographical films about Billy the Kid
Cultural depictions of Pat Garrett
Columbia Pictures films
Films directed by William Castle
1950s English-language films
1950s American films